The 2005–06 Men's EuroFloorball Cup Qualifying rounds took place over 3 to 7 August 2005 in Aalborg, Denmark. The top 2 teams advanced to the 2005–06 Men's EuroFloorball Cup Finals where they had a chance to win the EuroFloorball Cup for 2005–06.

The tournament was known as the 2005–06 Men's European Cup, but due to name implications, is now known as the 2005–06 Men's EuroFloorball Cup.

Qualifying results

Division A

Division B

See also
2005–06 Men's EuroFloorball Cup Finals

External links
Standings & Statistics

EuroFloorball Cup
Mens Eurofloorball Cup Qualifying, 2005-06